The 2011 AdvoCare V100 Independence Bowl, the 36th edition of the Independence Bowl, was a post-season American college football bowl game, held on December 26, 2011 at Independence Stadium in Shreveport, Louisiana as part of the 2011–12 NCAA bowl season. The game's title sponsor was AdvoCare, an American dietary supplement company.

The game, telecast at 4:00 p.m. CT on ESPN2, featured the Missouri Tigers from the Big 12 Conference versus the North Carolina Tar Heels from the Atlantic Coast Conference. This marked Missouri's third appearance in the Independence Bowl in the previous nine seasons, all under head coach Gary Pinkel, while North Carolina made its first appearance in this bowl.

Teams

The two teams had previously met twice with Missouri winning both games, in 1973 (27–14 in Chapel Hill) and 1976 (24–3 in Columbia). It marked North Carolina’s first game against a member of the Big 12 conference since a 52–21 loss to Texas in Chapel Hill in 2002.

North Carolina

The Tar Heels had a 14–14 bowl game record after the previous year's defeat of Tennessee in the 2010 Music City Bowl. The team was led by freshman tailback Giovani Bernard, who had 1,222 yards that season (sixth in school history) and by senior wide receiver Dwight Jones, who had 1,119 yards (second in school receiving yards). Sophomore quarterback Bryn Renner was a starter that year, who tied the school record with 23 touchdown passes.

Missouri

This game marked Mizzou’s third appearance in the game since 2003, winning over South Carolina in 2005 (38–31) and losing a 2003 contest to Arkansas (27–14). The Tigers, playing in their final football game as a member of the Big 12, were led by sophomore quarterback James Franklin, who ranked 15th in the NCAA in total offense (298.25 yards per game), had thrown for 200 yards or more six times during the season, and had run 839 yards and 13 rushing TDs. Missouri was ranked highly in the country in rushing offense (235.67 yards per game) and in total offense (472.42 yards per game).

Scoring Summary
Source

Statistics

References

2011–12 NCAA football bowl games
2011
2011
2011
December 2011 sports events in the United States
2011 in sports in Louisiana